Obafemi Devin Ayanbadejo (born March 5, 1975) is a former American football running back, fullback and special teams player. He was signed by the Minnesota Vikings as an undrafted free agent in 1997. In 1998 as a member of the Minnesota Vikings he was allocated to the London Monarchs of the NFL Europe league. A since defunct developmental league. Ayanbadejo also played for the Baltimore Ravens (1999-2002), Miami Dolphins (2002-2003), Arizona Cardinals 2004-2007), Chicago Bears (2007) and California Redwoods (2009) of the UFL. His professional football career began in 1997 and he officially retired from professional football in January, of 2010. He played college football at San Diego State.

Ayanbadejo earned a Super Bowl ring with the 2000 Ravens via Super Bowl XXXV. He is the older brother of NFL linebacker Brendon Ayanbadejo. Brendon is an All-Pro and Pro Bowler. Obafemi Ayanbadejo
met Larry Fitzgerald while a young "Fitz" was a ball boy for the Minnesota Vikings. The pair became teammates when the future Hall of Famer was drafted in the 1st round of the 2004 NFL Draft by the Arizona Cardinals. During that same 2004 season Emmitt Smith tossed his first and only touchdown pass of his 
Pro Football Hall of Fame career. That touchdown reception belongs to Ayanbadejo.

Early years
Ayanbadejo was born in Chicago to a Nigerian father and an American mother of Irish descent. His family moved to Santa Cruz, California just after his 11th birthday. He attended Mission Hill Junior High. As a high schooler he played football, baseball and basketball at Santa Cruz High School.

College career
Ayanbadejo played at San Diego State University where he was used as a tight end, receiver and out of the backfield. Prior to attending SDSU he began his college career as a two sport athlete playing football and baseball at Cabrillo College in Aptos, California. He was all Coast conference in both sports.

Professional career

Minnesota Vikings
Following his collegiate career at San Diego State, Ayanbadejo was signed as an undrafted free agent by the Vikings. He was cut by the team before the season began and did not play football that year. However, he was resigned by the Vikings in January, of 1998 and allocated to the London Monarchs of NFL Europe. That fall he resumed his Viking career where he spent time on both the practice squad and active roster. In 1999 he began the season on the Vikings active roster and was cut after week 3. He signed with the Baltimore Ravens in week 4 of the 1999 season.

Baltimore Ravens
Ayanbadejo was signed by the Baltimore Ravens in week 4 of the 1999 season after his week 3 release by the Vikings. He remained in Baltimore until Ayanbadejo was released by the Ravens after the 2001 season. His official release was in March 2002.

After a late signing with the Miami Dolphins in June 2002 he was the final roster cut at the end of training camp and failed to sign with another team, he sat out the 2002 NFL season.

Miami Dolphins
Ayanbadejo signed with the Miami Dolphins in 2003, appearing in 16 games (two starts) and catching 12 passes for 53 yards. His brother, Brendon Ayanbadejo, was a linebacker for the Dolphins that season.

Arizona Cardinals
In March 2004 Ayanbadejo signed a three-year deal with the Arizona Cardinals where he was reunited with head coach Dennis Green. He appeared in all but three games over that three year time period and was voted NFL player representative by his teammates. After playing out that contract, the Cardinals re-signed Obafemi Ayanbadejo to a two-year extension, though he was cut three months later.

Chicago Bears
Ayanbadejo signed with the Chicago Bears in 2007, becoming professional teammates with his younger brother, Brendon, for the third time in their careers.

In August 2007, Ayanbadejo was suspended for the first four games of the 2007 season after testing positive for a banned substance. Ayanbadejo's failed drug test was attributed to a tainted supplement and the company responsible settled with Ayanbadejo before the case went to trial. Ayanbadejo was the second player in NFL history to bring suit against a supplement company. Following his suspension, he was released from the Bears' roster.

California Redwoods
Ayanbadejo was drafted by the California Redwoods of the United Football League in the UFL Premiere Season Draft in 2009. He signed with the team on August 18. After a professional career that started in 1997, Ayanbadejo officially retired in January 2010.

Sportscasting career 
Obafemi Ayanbadejo is currently a gameday analyst for the Baltimore Ravens radio station WBAL.

Personal life
Ayanbadejo is the older brother of former NFL linebacker Brendon Ayanbadejo.

He went on to get an MBA from the Carey Business School at Johns Hopkins University.

References

External links
Just Sports Stats
United Football League bio

1975 births
Living people
Cabrillo Seahawks football players
Players of American football from Chicago
American people of Irish descent
American football fullbacks
American sportspeople of Nigerian descent
American people of Yoruba descent
Yoruba sportspeople
San Diego State Aztecs football players
Minnesota Vikings players
London Monarchs players
Baltimore Ravens players
Arizona Cardinals players
Miami Dolphins players
Sacramento Mountain Lions players
Chicago Bears players
Johns Hopkins Carey Business School alumni
Santa Cruz High School alumni
Sportspeople from Santa Cruz, California
Players of American football from California